Yu Ziqian (born 3 June 1985) is a Chinese retired football goalkeeper.

Club career
Yu Ziqian played for the Dalian Yiteng youth team before it was sold-off and then merged with Dalian Shide's own youth team. At Dalian Shide, Yu was trained by former England international goalkeeper Jimmy Rimmer, however before he had a chance to establish himself within the team he was seriously injured in a training session where he received a ruptured spleen and one year out of football. Upon his return from injury Yu was allowed to join third-tier club Shanxi Wosen Luhu in the 2002 league campaign before he returned to Dalian Shide after they needed a third choice goalkeeper the following season. At the top-tier club he would have to wait to establish himself until on April 9, 2003 in a 2002–03 AFC Champions League semi-final match he was given his debut after the first choice goalkeeper An Qi was sent-off and Yu had to deputize as Dalian Shide lost to Al Ain FC 4-2.

After making very little progress at Dalian Shide he was sold to top-tier club Qingdao Jonoon F.C. for 1.5 million Yuan and was expected to fight for the goalkeeping position against Liu Zhenli. After spending two seasons at the club Yu, however was unable to make the position his and he was allowed to leave for third-tier club Dalian Aerbin. The move would be a huge success and he would go on to win not only the successive league titles but promotion to the top tier of Chinese football, the Chinese Super League. At the beginning of the 2012 season Yu was even named vice-captain, however after a series of bad performance culminating in a 5-2 league defeat to Liaoning Whowin on July 28, 2012 Yu was dropped from the team.

In February 2015, Yu returned to Dalian Aerbin.

On 9 July 2020, Yu announced his retirement.

Career statistics
Statistics accurate as of match played 31 December 2019.

Honours
Dalian Aerbin
 China League One: 2011, 2017
 China League Two: 2010

Qingdao Hainiu
 China League Two: 2013

References

External links

Player profile at Sodasoccer.com

1985 births
Living people
Chinese footballers
Footballers from Dalian
Dalian Shide F.C. players
Qingdao Hainiu F.C. (1990) players
Qingdao F.C. players
Dalian Professional F.C. players
Chinese Super League players
China League One players
Association football goalkeepers